Kaneville is a village in southwestern Kane County, Illinois, United States. It was incorporated in November 2006, and the first elected officials were chosen in elections held on April 17, 2007. The village had a population of 484 at the 2010 census. Kaneville is part of the Chicago metropolitan area. The village was originally called "Royalton", but this was found to be taken by another settlement. The name was then changed to "Kaneville", referring to Elias Kane.

Geography
Kaneville is in southwestern Kane County, in the southeast part of Kaneville Township.

Demographics

Notable natives
Grace Ravlin, painter

References

External links
Official website

Villages in Illinois
Villages in Kane County, Illinois
2006 establishments in Illinois